is a 1923 black-and-white Japanese silent film directed by Koroku Numata. It is significant because it is the oldest preserved film featuring jidaigeki star Tsumasaburo Bando, appearing in a minor role. The value is further increased by the film being one of the very few extant works featuring the period-drama star Banya Ichikawa in the lead.

References

1923 films
Japanese silent films
Japanese black-and-white films